Autocharis sinualis is a moth in the family Crambidae. It is found in Eritrea, Rwanda and South Africa.

References

Moths described in 1899
Odontiinae
Moths of Africa